The 1948 Winter Olympics, officially known as the V Olympic Winter Games and commonly known as St. Moritz 1948, were a winter multi-sport event held from 30 January to 8 February 1948 in St. Moritz, Switzerland. The Games were the first to be celebrated after World War II; it had been twelve years since the last Winter Games in 1936.

From the selection of a host city in a neutral country to the exclusion of Japan and Germany, the political atmosphere of the post-war world was inescapable during the 1948 Games. The organizing committee faced several challenges due to the lack of financial and human resources consumed by the war. These were the first of two winter Olympic Games under the IOC presidency of Sigfrid Edström.

There were 28 nations that marched in the opening ceremonies on 30 January 1948. Bibi Torriani played for the Switzerland men's national ice hockey team, and became the first ice hockey player to recite the Olympic Oath on behalf of all athletes. Nearly 670 athletes competed in 22 events in four sports. The 1948 Games also featured two demonstration sports: military patrol, which later became the biathlon, and winter pentathlon, which was discontinued after these Games.  Notable performances were turned in by figure skaters Dick Button and Barbara Ann Scott and skier Henri Oreiller. Most of the athletic venues were already in existence from the first time St. Moritz hosted the Winter Games in 1928. All of the venues were outdoors, which meant the Games were heavily dependent on favorable weather conditions.

Host city selection 
The IOC selected St. Moritz to host the 1948 Games by acclamation at the 40 general session in Lausanne, Switzerland, on September 6, 1946. The selection process consisted of two bids, and saw St. Moritz be selected ahead of Lake Placid, New York, United States. St. Moritz was chosen due to the fact that all of the venues of the 1928 Winter Olympics were available and the Swiss resort could organise the Games much quicker than any other city except for 1936 host Garmish-Partenkirchen which was not considered. Despite the existence of many of the 1928 sites, it was still a difficult task to organize a Winter Olympic Games in less than 18 months.

Organizing

The Comite Olympique (CO) was composed of local dignitaries and members of the Swiss National Olympic Committee (COS).  They decided to separate into several sub-committees responsible for various aspects of the Games.  These committees included housing and maintenance, venue construction, finances, and media and advertising.  The local committees worked very closely with the Swiss federal government and the IOC to ensure that the organization of the Games proceeded without hindrance.  Since no athletes' village existed from the previous Games, the athletes and officials were housed in hotels around the city.  It was very important for the committees to draw upon their experiences from the 1928 Olympics.  Their selection of locations for the various events was contingent on the weather conditions as all the events were held outdoors.

Over 800 people were involved in reporting the news of the Games to the world.  Nearly 500 press credentials were issued by the Press Commission for the Games.  Television would not make its Olympic debut until 1956.  The coverage of the 1948 Games was split between newspapers and radio broadcasts.  The organizing committee had to provide technology, such as long-distance telephone lines and telegraph services, to assist the press in communicating with their constituents.

Over 2,200 people were needed to provide all the services for the press, officials and athletes at the Games.  These services included sanitation, security, and care of the venues.  Accommodating the influx of people into St. Moritz was a difficult task for the organizing committee.  It was complicated by the mountainous region in which the community was situated.  A massive project to improve the village's transportation infrastructure had to be completed prior to the Games.  This included building and widening roads for vehicular traffic.  Several train stations were built to accommodate the increased demands for public transit.  They also had to increase the capacity of the city's sewers.  All of the projects had to be approved by the Swiss government, and justified by its impact on the success of the Games.  To aid the organizing committee the IOC demanded that all participating nations provide lists of their athletes several months prior to the Games.  Consequently, the Swiss knew exactly how many athletes and officials to plan for.

Politics
Since these Games were the first since World War II they were given the name "The Games of Renewal."  Japan and Germany were not invited to these Games because they were still ostracized by the international community for their role in World War II.  Their absence was short-lived though, as they returned to Olympic competition in 1952.  The Soviet Union did not send athletes to the St. Moritz Games of 1948, but they did send ten delegates as observers of the Games to determine how successful the Soviet athletes would have been had they competed.

Impact of World War II
Sapporo, Japan had been the choice for the 1940 Winter Games.  In 1938, the Japanese decided to decline the invitation to host the Games claiming that preparations for the Olympic Games were draining the country's resources.  The IOC turned to the host of the 1936 Games, Garmisch-Partenkirchen, which would make it the only city to host consecutive Games.  This became impractical when Germany invaded Poland on September 1, 1939; subsequently Germany withdrew its bid to host the Games.  Finland believed it could host the Games and extended an invitation to the IOC, but the Soviet Union's invasion of Finland ended all hope of an Olympic Games in 1940.  The 1944 Winter Olympics had been awarded to Cortina d'Ampezzo, Italy in 1939.  As the war continued, this proved to be impractical and the second consecutive olympiad passed without a celebration of the Games.  The IOC was presented with two possible host cities for the first post-war Games: Lake Placid, United States and St. Moritz, Switzerland.  The IOC decided to award the Games to Switzerland, a neutral country, immediately following World War II, in order to avoid political posturing on the part of former combatants.

The impact of World War II was still being felt in 1948. The lack of financial resources and human energy made the organization of the Games challenging.  Athletes were also affected by a lack of resources.  Many competitors arrived with little or no equipment.  In one notable case, Norwegian skiers had to borrow skis from the American team in order to compete.

Events
Medals were awarded in 22 events contested in 4 sports (9 disciplines).
Bobsleigh

Skating

Skiing

There were also two demonstration sports, military patrol and the winter pentathlon.

Bobsled

Two sliding sports were contested at the 1948 Winter Games, the first was bobsled.  A controversy erupted when it was alleged that the sleds of the United States team had been sabotaged.  It was discovered that the steering wheels had been damaged.  After news broke of the apparent improprieties a truck driver stepped forward and admitted to having accidentally backed into the shed housing the bobsleds.  The accident however did not hinder the United States teams who won a bronze in the two-man event and a gold and a bronze in the four-man event.  The Swiss two-man teams placed first and second, which is the best possible results for the event since only two teams were allowed to enter.  The driver of the first place team, Felix Endrich, beat his coach, the driver of the second place team, Fritz Feierabend.

Ice Hockey

The ice hockey tournament was won by Canada, with Czechoslovakia second and Switzerland third. This was the fifth Olympic gold medal for Canada in hockey.  The only team to beat Canada since hockey was introduced at the 1920 Summer Olympics was Great Britain at the 1936 Winter Olympics.  The tournament was almost cancelled when rival teams representing the United States arrived. An Amateur Athletic Union (AAU) team was supported by the United States Olympic Committee (USOC), and an Amateur Hockey Association (AHA) team was supported by the Ligue Internationale de Hockey sur Glace (LIHG).  The International Olympic Committee ruled that neither team could compete, but the Swiss organizing committee allowed the AAU team to march in the opening ceremony, and the AHA team to play unofficially, without being eligible for medals.

Figure skating

Barbara Ann Scott became the first and only Canadian woman to win an Olympic gold medal in figure skating, when she won the competition at St. Moritz.  Despite the distraction caused by a low-flying airplane during her compulsory routine, she was able to muster the focus to place first entering the free skate.  The ice had been shredded the night before the free skate by two ice hockey games (the ice resurfacer had not yet been invented); nonetheless she was able to adjust her routine to avoid the potholes and emerge victorious.

Eighteen-year-old American Dick Button completed the unprecedented North American sweep of the figure skating gold medals.  He led the field after the compulsory skate and then won the gold medal by becoming the first person to ever complete a double Axel in competition. Later in the 1952 Olympics, Dick Button would win gold a second time.  Swiss world champion Hans Gerschwiler fell during the free skate, but rebounded to win the silver medal.

Speed skating

The speed skating competition was held on the same rink that had hosted the events in 1928. The competition was dominated by the Scandinavian countries of Norway and Sweden who won nine out of the twelve possible medals. Scandinavians had done poor in speed skating events up until the 1948 Games. The reason for their success was that speed skating in Europe had come to a stand still during World War II. Only countries that were ancillary to the conflict had the resources to keep their speed skating programs intact. The 500 meter race was won by Finn Helgesen of Norway. There was a three-way tie for second place between Norwegian Thomas Byberg and Americans Robert Fitzgerald and Kenneth Bartholomew. All three had finished in exactly 43.2 seconds. Swede Åke Seyffarth won a gold medal in the 10,000 meter race and a silver medal in the 1,500 meter race. The 5,000 meter event was affected by weather. The twenty racers encountered both wind, sun, and snow in the course of the day's competition. Finally long-distance specialist Reidar Liaklev from Norway prevailed.

Alpine skiing

Alpine skiing made its Olympic debut at these Games.  A few events had been held at the 1936 Games but the St. Moritz Games featured a full slate of three men's and three women's alpine events. Frenchman Henri Oreiller won a medal in all three Alpine events; gold in the downhill and combined, and bronze in the slalom.  He was one of only two athletes to win two gold medals at the 1948 Games, and he was also the only athlete to win three or more medals.

Austria dominated the women's alpine events, winning five out of a possible nine medals. Trude Beiser was a double-medal winner, earning gold in the combined event and silver in the downhill.  She was not the only female skier to win two medals though, United States skier Gretchen Fraser won gold in the slalom and took silver behind Beiser in the combined.  Austrian Erika Mahringer earned two medals by winning bronze medals in both the slalom and the combined.

Cross-country skiing

In cross-country skiing a total of 106 skiers from 15 nations competed in three events.  The events were the 50 kilometer race, the 18 kilometer race and the 4 x 10 kilometer relay.  There were no women's events at the 1948 Games. Martin Lundström of Sweden was the other athlete to win two gold medals when he won the 18 kilometer race and participated on the winning cross-country relay team.  Overall Sweden won seven out of a possible fifteen medals in the Nordic events, including all three gold medals and a sweep of the 18 kilometer race.  All fifteen medals were won by either Sweden, Norway, or Finland.

Skeleton

Skeleton made its second appearance at the Olympics during these Games.  It debuted at the 1928 Winter Olympics also held in St. Moritz.  Skeleton was a form of luge, which had originally appeared in the St. Moritz region at the end of the 19th century.  American John Heaton won his second Olympic medal in the skeleton, he won his first 20 years earlier when he was 19 years old. Italian slider Nino Bibbia won the gold medal.  It was the first of his 231 career wins on the Cresta Boblsed track.  One of the curves at Cesana Pariol, where the bobsled, luge, and skeleton events took place at the 2006 Winter Olympics in Turin, was named after Bibbia.

Nordic combined

The Nordic combined event had been contested at each Winter Olympics since 1924. Nordic combined required athletes to first compete in the open 18 kilometer cross-country ski race alongside the other cross-country competitors.  Their times would be assigned a point value.  Two days later the athletes would take two jumps off the ski jump hill.  The jumps would be given a point value and the longest jump would be combined with their cross-country time to create a score.  Traditional Nordic combined power Norway was stunned at the 1948 Games when Finland's Heikki Hasu became the first non-Norwegian to win the event.  In fact Norway did not even make the podium.  Hasu's teammate Martti Huhtala took the silver and Sven Israelsson from Sweden won the bronze.

Ski jumping

The Norwegians swept the ski jumping event. Birger Ruud had won the gold medal in the ski jumping event at both the 1932 and 1936 Winter Games.  The twelve-year hiatus due to World War II meant that Ruud was 36 years old in 1948.  He had retired from competition and was coaching the Norwegian team.  However, when he arrived at the Games he decided to come out of retirement and compete one last time.  Despite not having competed for several years he earned a silver medal.  Norwegian Petter Hugsted won the gold and teammate Thorleif Schjelderup won the bronze.

Demonstration sports

Two demonstration sports were held at the 1948 Games.  Military patrol had been a demonstration sport at the 1924, 1928, and 1936 Winter Olympic Games.  It entailed a combination of cross-country skiing and shooting at targets.  Eventually the competition would be renamed Biathlon and was made an official Olympic medal sport at the 1960 Games in Squaw Valley, United States.  Winter pentathlon involved five competitions: 10 kilometer cross-country ski race, shooting, downhill skiing, fencing and horseback riding.  This was the first and last time the event was held.  Fourteen competitors took part in the event.

Calendar
All dates are in Central European Time (UTC+1)
The opening ceremonies were held at 10:00 am on January 30 along with the initial hockey games and the first two runs of the two-man bobsled.  The closing ceremonies were held at 4:00 pm on February 8.  All of the medals were awarded at the closing ceremonies rather than immediately after the event as current tradition dictates.

Venues

The Stad Olympique (Olympic Stadium) hosted the opening and closing ceremonies.  The stadium was also used for speed skating, the figure skating competition and the medal games for ice hockey.  Most of the ice hockey games were held at the Suvretta and Kulm stadiums in St. Moritz.  Bobsled was held at the St. Moritz-Celerina Olympic Bobrun. Skeleton was contested on the Cresta Run track.  Olympia Bob Run was built in 1897 and modernized for the 1948 Games while the Cresta Run was first constructed in 1885.  The ski jump competitions were held at Olympiaschanze ski jump hill in St. Moritz.  It was built in 1927 for the 1928 Games, and remained in use until 2006.  The alpine events were held on ski-runs in and around Piz Nair.

Participating nations

28 nations competed in St. Moritz, the same number as the previous Winter Games in 1936. Chile, Denmark, Iceland, Korea, and Lebanon all made their Winter Olympic debut at these Games. Germany and Japan were not invited because of their involvement in World War II. Italy, despite being an Axis power originally, was allowed to send athletes after their defection to the Allies in 1943. Estonia, Latvia and Lithuania had been annexed by the Soviet Union in 1940, and would not compete again as independent nations until 1992. Argentina returned to the Winter Games after missing the 1932 and 1936 Games, and Australia and Luxembourg did not compete in 1948, even though they had participated in 1936.

Number of athletes by National Olympic Committees

Medal count

These are the top ten nations that won medals at the 1948 Winter Games.

Podium sweeps

See also
 List of 1948 Winter Olympics medal winners

Notes

External links

 
 
 
 
 
 
 

 
Olympic Games in Switzerland
Winter Olympics by year
Winter Olympics
Winter Olympics
Sport in St. Moritz
Winter Olympics
Winter Olympics
Winter sports competitions in Switzerland